History of The Byrds is a double album compilation by the American rock band the Byrds and was released on May 18, 1973 by CBS Records (see 1973 in music).  The compilation was released exclusively in Europe and the UK, peaking at number 47 on the UK Albums Chart, but it was also available in the United States as an import.

Contents
History of The Byrds provides a chronological survey of the band's career from 1965 to 1971, a period when they were signed to Columbia Records.  It begins with the Byrds' debut single on Columbia, "Mr. Tambourine Man", and culminates with their final single release for the label, "America's Great National Pastime".  The album features the first appearance on an LP of the non-album single "Lady Friend" and the 1965 B-side "She Don't Care About Time".

It was issued to coincide with the reunion of the original members of the Byrds and the release of a reunion album, titled Byrds, in March 1973.  However, none of the tracks from the 1973 reunion album were included on History of The Byrds, due to that album having appeared on Asylum Records rather than on Columbia.  At the time of its release, History of The Byrds was the most comprehensive overview of the band's recorded output available.  Every variation of the Byrds' ever changing lineup is represented within the album's song selection and as such, it provides a survey of the band's musical journey from their days as folk rock and psychedelic rock pioneers through to their later exploration of country rock.  Many of the band's biggest selling singles are included, along with a number of their best known album tracks.  Consequently, the album includes musical contributions from all of the key players in the Byrds' convoluted history, including Gene Clark, David Crosby, Chris Hillman, Michael Clarke, Gram Parsons, Clarence White, and the group's only consistent member, Roger McGuinn.

The album's front cover made use of a David Gahr photograph featuring the last lineup of the Byrds to be represented on the album: Roger McGuinn, Skip Battin, Gene Parsons, and Clarence White.  The same photograph had already been used for the cover of the U.S. compilation album The Best of The Byrds: Greatest Hits, Volume II just six months earlier. It is likely that CBS in the UK didn't have access to the original photograph because the cover of History of The Byrds features the same track listing as Greatest Hits, Volume II, with three amendments added in a noticeably smaller font over black bars that cover track names from the earlier compilation. The back cover of History of The Byrds included liner notes by Kim Fowley and the inside gatefold sleeve of the double vinyl LP featured Pete Frame's "Byrds Family Tree".  This intricately detailed flowchart traced the group's roots and complicated membership history over the years. The very first pressing of this double LP mentioned the Byrds English fan club's (run by Chrissie Oakes) name and address in the middle of the family tree.

Despite being one of the band's biggest selling compilations in Europe, History of The Byrds went out of print in the early 1990s and has never been released on CD.

Track listing

Side 1
"Mr. Tambourine Man" (Bob Dylan) – 2:20
"Turn! Turn! Turn!" (Book of Ecclesiastes/Pete Seeger) – 3:49
"She Don't Care About Time" (Gene Clark) – 2:28
"Wild Mountain Thyme" (traditional, arranged Roger McGuinn, Chris Hillman, Michael Clarke, David Crosby) – 2:29
"Eight Miles High" (Gene Clark, Roger McGuinn, David Crosby) – 3:35
"Mr. Spaceman" (Roger McGuinn) – 2:08
"5D (Fifth Dimension)" (Roger McGuinn) – 2:32

Side 2
"So You Want to Be a Rock 'n' Roll Star" (Chris Hillman, Roger McGuinn) – 2:03
"Time Between" (Chris Hillman) – 1:56
"My Back Pages" (Bob Dylan) – 3:05
"Lady Friend" (David Crosby) – 2:30
 "Goin' Back" (Carole King, Gerry Goffin) – 3:26
 "Old John Robertson" (Chris Hillman, Roger McGuinn) – 1:51
 "Wasn't Born to Follow" (Carole King, Gerry Goffin) – 2:02

Side 3
"You Ain't Goin' Nowhere" (Bob Dylan) – 2:33
"Hickory Wind" (Gram Parsons, Bob Buchanan) – 3:30
"Nashville West" (Gene Parsons, Clarence White) – 2:30
"Drug Store Truck Drivin' Man" (Roger McGuinn, Gram Parsons) – 3:52
"Gunga Din" (Gene Parsons) – 3:01
"Jesus Is Just Alright" (Arthur Reid Reynolds) – 2:09
"Ballad of Easy Rider" (Roger McGuinn, Bob Dylan) – 2:01
NOTE: Bob Dylan is not officially credited as a songwriter on "Ballad of Easy Rider".

Side 4
"Chestnut Mare" (Roger McGuinn, Jacques Levy) – 5:10
"Yesterday's Train" (Gene Parsons, Skip Battin) – 3:32
"Just a Season" (Roger McGuinn, Jacques Levy) – 3:52
"Citizen Kane" (Skip Battin, Kim Fowley) – 2:35
"Jamaica (Say You Will)" (Jackson Browne) – 3:25
"Tiffany Queen" (Roger McGuinn) – 2:40
"America's Great National Pastime" (Skip Battin, Kim Fowley) – 2:56

Personnel

The Byrds
Roger McGuinn - guitar, banjo, vocals
Gene Clark - tambourine, vocals
David Crosby - guitar, vocals (electric bass on "Old John Robertson")
Chris Hillman - electric bass, guitar, vocals
Michael Clarke - drums
Gram Parsons - acoustic guitar, piano, organ, vocals
Kevin Kelley - drums
Clarence White - lead guitar, vocals
John York - electric bass, backing vocals
Gene Parsons - drums, acoustic guitar, harmonica, vocals
Skip Battin - electric bass, piano, vocals

Additional personnel
Jerry Cole - rhythm guitar (on "Mr. Tambourine Man")
Larry Knechtel - electric bass (on "Mr. Tambourine Man" and "Citizen Kane")
Hal Blaine - drums (on "Mr. Tambourine Man")
Leon Russell - electric piano (on "Mr. Tambourine Man")
Van Dyke Parks - organ (on "5D (Fifth Dimension)")

Hugh Masekela - trumpet (on "So You Want to Be a Rock 'n' Roll Star" and "Lady Friend")
Vern Gosdin – acoustic guitar (on "Time Between")
Jim Gordon - drums (on "Goin' Back")
Red Rhodes - pedal steel guitar (on "Goin' Back" and "Wasn't Born to Follow")
Paul Beaver - Moog synthesizer (on "Goin' Back")
Dennis McCarthy - celeste (on "Goin' Back")
James Burton - guitar (on "Goin' Back")
Terry Trotter - piano (on "Goin' Back")
Lester Harris - cello (on "Goin' Back")
Victor Sazer, Carl West - violin (on "Goin' Back")
Ann Stockton - harp (on "Goin' Back")
Dennis Faust - percussion (on "Goin' Back")
Lloyd Green - pedal steel guitar (on "You Ain't Goin' Nowhere", "Hickory Wind" and "Drug Store Truck Drivin' Man")
John Hartford - fiddle (on "Hickory Wind")
Glen D. Hardin - organ (on "Gunga Din")
Sneaky Pete Kleinow - pedal steel guitar (on "Yesterday's Train")
Jimmi Seiter - percussion (on "Citizen Kane")

References

Albums produced by Terry Melcher
Albums produced by Gary Usher
Albums produced by Bob Johnston
The Byrds compilation albums
1973 greatest hits albums
Columbia Records compilation albums
Albums produced by Roger McGuinn
Albums produced by Gene Parsons
Albums produced by Skip Battin
Albums produced by Clarence White